Namathevan a/l Arunasalam (born 26 July 1996) is a Malaysian footballer who plays as a right-back for Malaysia Super League club Penang.

Club career

Selangor
Namathevan began his football career with Selangor youth team before being promoted to first team in 2016. On 22 October 2016, Namathevan made his league debut for Selangor in a 1–2 defeat to Johor Darul Ta'zim at Shah Alam Stadium.

Career statistics

Club

1 Includes AFC Cup and AFC Champions League.

References

External links
 Arunasalam Namathevan at FA Selangor
 

1996 births
Living people
Malaysian footballers
Negeri Sembilan FC players
Selangor FA players
Penang F.C. players
Malaysia Super League players
Tamil sportspeople
Malaysian people of Tamil descent
Association football fullbacks
Malaysian Hindus
People from Selangor